Lagocheirus kathleenae is a species of longhorn beetles of the subfamily Lamiinae. It was described by Hovore in 1998, and is found in Costa Rica and Panama.

References

Beetles described in 1998
Lagocheirus